INVOLVE (UK National Advisory group) (known as INVOLVE) is a national advisory group, funded by the Department of Health, that promotes public involvement in health and social care research. Established in 1996, it was originally called "Consumers in NHS Research". It expanded to cover public health and social care research in 2001, and changed its name to INVOLVE in July 2003. The current Chair of INVOLVE is Tina Coldham and its Director is Zoe Gray.

As a national advisory group INVOLVE's role is to bring together expertise, insight and experience in the field of public involvement in research, with the aim of advancing it as an essential part of the process by which research is identified, prioritised, designed, conducted and disseminated.

The INVOLVE vision:
A world of active public research partnerships leading to improvement of health and care for all.

The INVOLVE mission:
INVOLVE is the lead for advancement of public involvement in health and care research across NIHR and beyond. We achieve this by working with others to raise aspirations, drive up standards, provide guidance and facilitate partnerships.

References

External links
 Involve

Department of Health and Social Care
Health in Hampshire
Organisations based in Hampshire
Test Valley
National Institute for Health and Care Research